Kurt Voß (8 July 1900 – 8 April 1978) was a German international footballer.

References

1900 births
1978 deaths
Association football forwards
German footballers
Germany international footballers
Holstein Kiel players